Mimi Lien (born 1976) is an American set designer, best known for doing the scenic design of Natasha, Pierre, & The Great Comet of 1812. In 2017, she received a Tony Award for her work with the Broadway production. Lien is also a 2015 recipient of a MacArthur Fellowship.

Education 
Lien graduated from Yale University in 1997, and she then attended New York University where she earned her MFA in design from Tisch School of the Arts in 2003. Much of Lien's education is centered around architecture, which contributes to the large scale of her set designs. She has designed over 100 shows, operas, and installations, including 2 Broadway premiers. Lien is currently teaching as an adjunct professor in Set Design at NYU Tisch.

Theater 

 Suffragist (2022)
 LOVE UNPUNISHED 2021 (2021)
 Help (2020)
 Moby-Dick (2019)
 The Thin Place (2019)
 SUPERTERRANEAN (2019)
 Fairview (2019)
 The Secret Life of Bees (2019)
 Die Zauberflöte (2019)
 True West (2018)
 Lifespan of a Fact (2018)
 Fairview (2018)
 Memoirs of a Unicorn 
 A Period of Animate Existence (2017)
 Four Nights of Dream (2017)
 Pelleas et Melisande (2017)
 Natasha, Pierre, & the Great Comet (2016)
 24-Decade History of Popular Music (2016)
 War (2016)
 Lost in the Meadow (2015)
 Memory Palace (2015)
 John (2015)
 The Long Walk Opera (2015)
 Preludes (2015)
 An Octoroon (2015)

Awards and nominations

References

External links 

 Mimi Lien at the Internet Broadway Database
 Mimi Lien at the Internet Off-Broadway Database

Living people
American set designers
Tony Award winners
Yale University alumni
MacDowell Colony fellows
Tisch School of the Arts alumni
MacArthur Fellows
1976 births